United Nations Security Council Resolution 26, adopted unanimously on June 4, 1947, modified the rules of procedure so that when the Council was voting to fill a position on the International Court of Justice, voting would continue as long as is needed until one candidate holds an absolute majority of the votes.

See also
List of United Nations Security Council Resolutions 1 to 100 (1946–1953)

References
Text of the Resolution at undocs.org

External links
 

 0026
 0026
 0026
June 1947 events